Phil John may refer to:
Phil John (rugby union, born 1962), Welsh rugby union hooker
Phil John (rugby union, born 1981), Welsh rugby union prop
Philip John, screenwriter

See also
Phil and John, a Christian music duo